Daniel Kipchirchir Komen (born November 27, 1984, in Chemorgong, Koibatek District) is a Kenyan middle-distance runner who specializes in the 1500 metres.

He graduated from Timboroa High School in 2003. He started running seriously while at high school.

In 2003 he finished second at the 2003 African Junior Championships 5000 metres race, behind Boniface Kiprop Toroitich of Uganda. He competed at the 2005 World Championships in Athletics in Helsinki but missed the 1500 metres final.

On June 10, 2007, he ran the fastest mile ever run in the United States, breaking a record that Eamonn Coghlan had held since 1983 with a 3:48.28 in Eugene, Oregon.  He competed at the 2007 World Championships in Athletics in Osaka missing the 1500 metres final.

He is coached by Jimmy Beuttah and Joseph Ngure. Komen trains at the IAAF High Altitude Training Centre in Eldoret.

Achievements

Personal bests
1500 metres - 3:29.02 - Rome (ITA) - 14/07/2006
Mile - 3:48.28 - Eugene (OR) - 10/06/2007
3000 metres - 7:31.41	 - Doha - 06/05/2011
5000 metres - 13:04.02 - Rabat - 06/06/2010

References

External links

IAAF, August 25, 2007: Focus on Africa - Daniel Kipchirchir Komen

1984 births
Living people
Kenyan male middle-distance runners
People from Baringo County